The Arrowwood National Wildlife Refuge Complex consists of numerous National Wildlife Refuges and Wetland Management Districts in the U.S. state of North Dakota. The protected areas managed include:

 Arrowwood National Wildlife Refuge
 Johnson Lake National Wildlife Refuge (easement refuge)
 Arrowwood Wetland Management District
 Chase Lake National Wildlife Refuge
 Chase Lake Wetland Management District
 Half-way Lake National Wildlife Refuge (easement refuge)
 Valley City Wetland Management District
 Hobart Lake National Wildlife Refuge (easement refuge)
 Sibley Lake National Wildlife Refuge (easement refuge)
 Stoney Slough National Wildlife Refuge (easement refuge)
 Tomahawk National Wildlife Refuge (easement refuge)

References

External links
 

National Wildlife Refuges in North Dakota